is an afternoon drive-time show airing on KISW (99.9 FM Seattle). The comedy and hot talk program first aired in 2005, and was nationally syndicated from 2017-2020. The show's hosts are Miles Montgomery, Steve "The Thrill" Hill, and "Thee" Ted Smith, and is produced by Mike Hawk.

History 

The Mens Room radio show began in Baltimore when program director Bill Pasha assembled current hosts Miles Montgomery and Steve Hill for a talk-based radio program called Out To Lunch, which ran from 2003-2005 on WXYV-FM with those hosts after Miles replaced Bill Rohland in October 2003. The show moved to Seattle in the spring of 2005, and first aired on 100.7 The Buzz. The show then moved to 99.9 KISW, and eventually grew into the highest-rated afternoon show in all of Seattle.  The show was a nationally syndicated radio program produced by Westwood One from 2017 into June 2020, before being dropped from Westwood One.

The Mens Room radio show is also distributed as four daily podcasts edited to remove local network advertisements and music.

Personalities 
 Steve "The Thrill" Hill: Host, 2005–present
 Miles Montgomery: Host, 2005–present
 "Thee" Ted Smith: Host, 2005–present
 Ben "The Psycho Muppet" Watts: Producer, 2005-2016
 Mike Hawk: Producer, 2015–present
 Robin Foxx: Producer, 2017-2020

Segments 

The show consists of several regular segments on either a daily or weekly basis.

Question of the Day 

Episodes often begin with Hill reading one or more news stories that prompt a "question of the day," which serves as a prompt for listeners to call in with a personal story in response. The first two hours of the show typically consist of the hosts taking listener calls and often telling their own stories relative to the day's prompt.

Big Dummy 
The Mens Room's take on a game show, this weekly segment replaces the first two hours of the show each Thursday replacing the Question of the Day segment. Listeners can call in to the show to participate in the trivia quiz show format, which differs from traditional game shows in that the hosts will continue to ask the contestant questions until they get one question right.

Profile This 
A daily segment which invites listeners to call in and participate. The format of the segment sees Hill read a news story omitting one key detail, after which the contestant must choose among multiple options which detail "makes the story, a story." This segment was inspired by an earlier iteration of the segment called "Black, White, Mexi, or Jew," which similarly saw contestants guessing the race of the subject of a story based on the contextual clues presented in the story. Due to the perceived insensitive nature of the original game's name and content, the format was changed to focus less on race and more on other topics.

TV Time with Ted 

A daily segment wherein Smith discusses recent and upcoming television programming of note.

Ted or Late Night? 

Originating as a sub-segment of TV Time with Ted, this segment sees Smith reading jokes followed by the rest of the hosts guessing whether the jokes were created by Smith himself, or if they were pulled from an actual late night television host's show.

Ted vs. The FCC 

A weekly segment which consists of Smith, noted for his challenges with reading and pronunciation, attempts to read a listener-submitted tongue twister. These tongue twisters are often written such that the expected slip-up would result in Smith saying a word or words that are banned from radio airwaves, thus getting him in trouble with the FCC, the agency that oversees radio communication standards in the United States.

Ted's Meat and Potatoes 

During this weekly segment, Smith, appearing as his alter ego Head Chef of the Mens Room, Thee Ted Nougat recites food facts, results of food-related surveys or other food related topics, often themed to the time of year or nearby holidays.

Other Media 
The Mens Room hosts have also created other media properties distributed as standalone podcasts or live streaming internet radio.

The Mens Room Appy Hour 
Appy Hour is daily twenty-minute show available only as a live stream via the Audacy app immediately following the conclusion of the daily Mens Room show on live terrestrial radio. The show is hosted by the same quartet as the regular daily show. Due to being streamed exclusively over the internet rather than terrestrial radio, the show is uncensored and features discussions of topics that would not normally be "suitable for the airwaves."

The Greatest Story Never Told 
From October 2019 to July 2021, Montgomery and Hill distributed a weekly podcast through Audacy. This show allowed the hosts to dive more deeply into some of the greatest stories of their past, and would occasionally feature other personalities, such as Smith. The show is also produced by Mike Hawk. The show was discontinued after July 2021 when it was replaced by The Mens Room Appy Hour.

Thee Podcast 
Since September 2013, Thee Ted Smith has hosted a weekly podcast also distributed through Audacy. The show has featured other hosts, often personal friends of Smith, and covers topics such as current goings-on in their respective lives, as well as events in the greater Seattle area where the hosts live.

The MegaCast 
A weekly podcast hosted by Smith and fellow KISW personality Steve Migs.

Products and philanthropy 

Mens Room Original Red is a beer brewed by Elysian Brewing Company of which a portion of profits are donated to the Pacific Northwest's Fisher House. Men's Room Sausage is produced by Uli's Sausage of Seattle,  is made with Mens Room Original Red beer, and also contributes a portion of profits to the Fisher House.  Elysian also brews Mens Room Gold and Mens Room Black seasonally with the same arrangement of Fisher House donations.

References

American radio programs